Tahar Cheriaa (January 5, 1927 – November 4, 2010) was a Tunisian film critic and the founder of the Carthage Film Festival in 1966, the first Panafrican and Panarab film festival.

Biography
Cheriaa was born in Sayada in Tunisia. He was the founder of the Carthage Film Festival in 1966 and he led the first five events which were held every other year.

Cheria was involved in the translation of Arabic poetry and he was a writer and spokesperson for Arab-African film culture. He was awarded the Grand Cordon of National Merit.

Cheriaa died in Ezzahra in 2010. He is buried in his hometown of Sayada.

References

External links 
 

1927 births
2010 deaths
Tunisian film directors
People from Sayada